Esmeralda Arosemena de Troitiño is a lawyer and Supreme Count judge. She is a Panamanian Commissioner of the Inter-American Commission on Human Rights (OAS). In 2019 she became President of that body.

Life
Troitiño is from Panama. She has two degrees. The first is in Philosophy, Letters and Education, with a specialization in Pedagogy and she also has a degree in Law and Political Science.

In 2011 she was working for the Commission preparing the 2016 Constitutional Procedural Code for Panama. She has been Vice President of Panama's Supreme Court of Justice as well as being a judge. She was President of the Panama's Criminal Chamber II and a judge for the Superior Court of Children and Adolescents. 

She was elected to the Inter-American Commission on Human Rights on June 16, 2015, by the OAS General Assembly, for a four-year term that runs from January 1, 2016, through December 31, 2019.

In February 2019 Esmeralda Arosemena de Troitiño was elected by the seven commissioners to be President of  Inter-American Commission on Human Rights (IACHR), whilst at a meeting in Sucre, Bolivia. During the COVID-19 pandemic in December 2020 and January 2021 she assisted in a virtual visit by Julissa Mantilla et al of the IACHR to Mexico. The team investigated the conditions of migrants in the country including the 66,000 created by Donald Trump's "Stay in Mexico" program.

In 2022 she presented the IACHR's report on human rights in Nicaragua. The report noted that since 2018 there had been ""serious human rights violations".

References

Living people
Year of birth missing (living people)
Panamanian judges
Inter-American Commission on Human Rights commissioners